George Albert Ravenhill VC (21 February 1872 – 14 April 1921) was an English recipient of the Victoria Cross, the highest award for gallantry in the face of the enemy that can be awarded to British and other Commonwealth forces. Ravenhill is one of eight men whose VCs were involuntarily forfeited.

Military service
Ravenhill was born in Aston, Birmingham in 1872. In May 1889 Ravenhill joined the 1st Battalion of The Royal Scots Fusiliers at Birr, County Offaly. He served near six years in India then two years with the 2nd Battalion in South Africa. He gained the Queen's and the King's medals, with clasps, for Relief of Ladysmith, Transvaal and Cape Colony.

Ravenhill was 27 years old, and a private in the 2nd Battalion, The Royal Scots Fusiliers, British Army during the Second Boer War when the following deed took place on 15 December 1899 at the battle of Colenso, South Africa for which he was awarded the VC. His citation reads:

He was wounded at Colenso due to being shot through the forearm.

Forfeiture
Ravenhill's VC was forfeited in 1908 after he was imprisoned for theft of a quantity of iron and could not afford to pay the 10 shilling fine. His VC-entitled pension was also withdrawn. Ravenhill died in poverty at the age of 49, and three of his children were taken away to be fostered in the USA and Canada. Ravenhill is buried in an unmarked grave at Witton Cemetery, Birmingham.

The Medal
Ravenhill's Victoria Cross is currently displayed at the Museum of The Royal Highland Fusiliers in Glasgow, Scotland.

See also

 Victoria Cross forfeitures
 List of Boer War Victoria Cross recipients

References

Further reading

—;

External links
 Location of grave and VC medal (Birmingham)
 

1872 births
1921 deaths
Royal Scots Fusiliers soldiers
Military personnel from Birmingham, West Midlands
Second Boer War recipients of the Victoria Cross
British recipients of the Victoria Cross
Victoria Cross forfeitures
British Army personnel of the Second Boer War
British Army recipients of the Victoria Cross